Thomas O'Ware (born 20 March 1993) is a Scottish professional footballer, who plays for Kelty Hearts in Scottish League Two as a defender. O'Ware has previously played for Greenock Morton and Partick Thistle. He is also the Head Coach with the Troon F.C. Development Team, who compete in the Lowland Development League (West).

Early life
Born in Irvine, North Ayrshire, Troon resident O'Ware attended Queen Margaret Academy in Ayr.

Playing career

Youth
After beginning his career with hometown team Troon Thistle boys club, O'Ware spent five years in the Rangers youth system at Murray Park, then a further two at Kilmarnock. He then signed for youth side Bonnyton Thistle, where he was part of the team that won the Under-19 Scottish Cup final.

Morton
O'Ware joined Greenock Morton in 2011. He made his début at left back in a Scottish Cup tie against Deveronvale on 19 November 2011. O'Ware also had a trial at EFL Championship side Middlesbrough. He broke into the Morton team at left back due to an injury to Ross Forsyth. In January 2012, O'Ware suffered a stress fracture to his tibia making him miss at least a month of Morton's season. O'Ware agreed one-year extensions with Morton in 2013, 2014 and 2015.

In April 2016, O'Ware's good form resulted in him being awarded a two-year contract extension with the club. He won the Scottish Championship Player of the Month award for October 2016 and was twice named in the Scottish Championship Team of the Year in successive seasons. He also finished season 2016/17 as Europe’s top scoring defender with 11 goals.

This form brought him to the attention of a host of Scottish Premiership clubs, and he was linked with a move to his boyhood heroes Celtic in the summer of 2017, as Brendan Rodgers looked to solidify his back line.

After the sacking of manager Jim Duffy in May 2018, O'Ware left the club seeking "a new challenge". Thomas featured at full-back, centre-back, centre midfield, and occasionally as a striker during his seven seasons at Cappielow.

Partick Thistle
O'Ware signed a two-year contract with Partick Thistle in June 2018. He scored his first goal for the Jags on 14 August 2018, opening the scoring in a 5–0 win at Stranraer in the Scottish Challenge Cup. On 25 August 2018, O'Ware was substituted four minutes into the game against Dundee United due to a knee injury, and it was later revealed that he would miss the remainder of the season as a result.
O'Ware scored his first league goal for Thistle in the final game of the decade, scoring the winner against his former side Greenock Morton in a 2–1 away win. O'Ware signed a two-year contract extension with Thistle in January 2020.

Kelty Hearts
After leaving Partick Thistle on 29 July 2021, O'Ware joined newly-promoted Scottish League Two side Kelty Hearts on 30 July 2021 ahead of the 2021-22 campaign.

International
O'Ware represented Scotland at schoolboy level in 2011.

Coaching

During his playing career, O'Ware has already begun his coaching career and has experience working in the Greenock Morton academy working mainly with the Under 14s, U15s and U16s.

He has also been studying for his UEFA 'B' Licence.

After rupturing his ACL at Partick Thistle, O’Ware helped out with the coaching staff under then manager Gary Caldwell, and spent matchdays in the dugout as part of the non-playing staff.

Troon F.C. Development Team
O'Ware was appointed as Head Coach for the Troon F.C. Development Team in August 2020, who will be competing in the Lowland Development League (West) in season 2020–21.

Career statistics

Honours

Club
Bonnyton Thistle
 Under-19 Scottish Cup: 2010–11

Greenock Morton
 Scottish League One: 2014–15

Individual
 Scottish Championship Player of the Month (1): October 2016
2016–17 Championship Team of the Year

See also
Greenock Morton F.C. season 2011–12 | 2012–13 | 2013–14 | 2014–15 | 2015–16

References

External links

1993 births
Living people
Footballers from Irvine, North Ayrshire
Greenock Morton F.C. players
Association football defenders
Scottish footballers
Rangers F.C. players
Kilmarnock F.C. players
Scottish Football League players
Scottish Professional Football League players
Association football midfielders
Scotland youth international footballers
People educated at Queen Margaret Academy
People from Troon
Partick Thistle F.C. players
Footballers from South Ayrshire
Kelty Hearts F.C. players